Thomas Brodrick (4 August 1654 – 3 October 1730) was an Irish and British politician who sat in the Irish House of Commons between 1692 and 1727 and also in the British House of Commons from 1713 to 1727. He owned lands in both Surrey in England, and County Cork, Ireland.

Life
Brodrick was the eldest son of Sir St John Brodrick of Ballyannan, Midleton, County Cork and his wife Alice Clayton, daughter of Laurence Clayton of Mallow, County Cork. He was admitted at Trinity Hall, Cambridge and also at Middle Temple in 1670. He received an LLB in 1677.  He inherited lands at Wandsworth in 1680, and received a settlement of some of the family's Irish lands upon marrying.

Brodrick sat in the Irish House of Commons for Midleton from 1692 to 1693, for County Cork from 1695 to 1699 and again from 1703 to 1713, and for Midleton again from 1715 to 1727. He was appointed to the Irish Privy Council in 1695, removed by the Tory administration in 1711 but reappointed in 1714.

Brodrick lived more in England than Ireland in his adult years.  He had contacts with Whig politicians in England and was appointed Comptroller of the Salt in 1706, and joint comptroller of army accounts from 1708 to 1711. He was elected as Member of Parliament for Stockbridge at the 1713 general election and again at the 1715 general election. At the 1722 general election, he was elected as MP for Guildford. He did not stand in the 1727 general election.
  Dean Jonathan Swift referred to him in connection with his political activities at least twice in his writings.

Personal life
Brodrick died on 3 October 1730 at the family estate at Wandsworth, and was buried there. He was brother of Alan Brodrick, 1st Viscount Midleton. He married Anne Piggott, daughter of Alexander Piggott of Innishannon and they had one son, Laurence, who was appointed Register of Deeds and Conveyances in Ireland in 1735.

References

1654 births
Politicians from County Cork
Members of the Parliament of Ireland (pre-1801) for County Cork constituencies
Irish MPs 1692–1693
Irish MPs 1695–1699
Irish MPs 1703–1713
Irish MPs 1715–1727
Members of the Parliament of Great Britain for English constituencies
British MPs 1713–1715
British MPs 1715–1722
British MPs 1722–1727
Members of the Privy Council of Ireland
1730 deaths